Joakim Eyde (born 12 December 1991) is a retired Norwegian football defender.

He hails from Nesodden. He went on to youth football for Vålerenga, made his debut as a Norway youth international and trialled with Tottenham Hotspur. In 2008 he joined Stabæk, only to rejoin Vålerenga in the autumn of 2008. In 2009 he tried his luck in senior football with Nesodden IF, only to play the latter half of the season for Fredrikstad's junior team. Despite falling short of the youth international squads, he was signed by 1. divisjon team Sarpsborg 08.

He played half the games in the 2010 season, which ended in promotion, and then 8 Eliteserien games in 2011. In 2012 he rejoined Nesodden, and after a break from football, he later played for Skjetten SK.

References

1991 births
Living people
People from Nesodden
Norway youth international footballers
Norwegian footballers
Sarpsborg 08 FF players
Skjetten SK players
Norwegian First Division players
Eliteserien players
Association football defenders
Sportspeople from Viken (county)